Abū ʿAmr Khalīfa ibn Khayyāṭ al-Laythī al-ʿUṣfurī (born : 160/161 AH/777 AD– died 239/240 AH/854 AD) was an Arab historian.

His family were natives of Basra in Iraq. His grandfather was a noted muhaddith or traditionalist, and Khalifa became renowned for this also. Among the great Islamic scholars who were his pupils were Bukhari and Ahmad ibn Hanbal.

He wrote at least four works, of which two have survived, these being the Tabaqat (biographies) and Tarikh (history). The latter is valuable as being one of three of the earliest Arabic histories, but the full text was not known until an 11th-century copy was found in 1966, in the Nassiriyya Zawiya in Tamegroute, where the local dry climate helped preserving it, and was published in 1967 after being scrutinized by Syrian historian Souhail Zakkar.

References
J. Schacht (1969), "The Kitāb al-Tārīḫ of Khalifa bin Hayyat", Arabica, 16, 79–81. Schacht found the manuscript, and in the article reviews its publication by one of his former students.

9th-century historians from the Abbasid Caliphate
770s births
Year of birth uncertain
850s deaths
Year of death uncertain
People from Basra
8th-century Arabs